Daniel Sorano (1920–1962) was a French stage and film actor.

Filmography

References

Bibliography
 Goble, Alan. The Complete Index to Literary Sources in Film. Walter de Gruyter, 1999.

External links

1920 births
1962 deaths
French male film actors
Male actors from Toulouse